Reginald Storum Weir  (September 30, 1911 – August 22, 1987) was an American tennis player and physician.

Tennis 
Weir was captain of the City College of New York men's tennis team. After graduating from CCNY in 1931, he was American Tennis Association (ATA) national champion in 1931, 1932, 1933, 1937, and 1942.

With the support of the NAACP, Weir and a partner originally attempted to play at a United States Lawn Tennis Association's (USLTA)-sponsored indoor tournament in 1929, but they were turned away when organizers realized he was African-American. Later, in 1948, he successfully gained entrance to the USLTA's National Indoor Tournament in New York, becoming the first African-American man to play at a USLTA event. He won his first-round game on March 11, 1948, but did not advance further. His entrance to the tournament was the result of several years of lobbying by the ATA, and paved the way for Althea Gibson to be accepted and advance to the quarterfinals the following year.

Outside of tennis 
Weir was born on September 30, 1911 in Washington, D.C. to parents, Felix Weir, American violinist and educator, and Ethel Storum Weir.  A resident of Fair Lawn, New Jersey, he died there on August 22, 1987. Weir was a graduate of the medical school of New York University and practiced family medicine from 1935 to 1985.

References

External links
 

1911 births
1987 deaths
African-American male tennis players
American male tennis players
African-American history of New Jersey
American primary care physicians
City College of New York alumni
People from Fair Lawn, New Jersey
New York University alumni
20th-century African-American sportspeople